Alfredo "Fred" Apostoli (February 2, 1913 – November 29, 1973) was a rugged, accomplished body punching middleweight, who was recognized as the world champion when he defeated Marcel Thil on September 23, 1937. Statistical boxing website BoxRec lists Apostoli as the #8 ranked middleweight of all time. He was inducted into the Ring Magazine Hall of Fame in 1978, the World Boxing Hall of Fame in 1988, and the International Boxing Hall of Fame in 2003.

Early life
Freddie Apostoli was born in San Francisco and lived in North Beach and Fisherman's Wharf as a young child. His father worked as both a fisherman and laborer in the San Francisco area but had grown up in a farming community near Gibbstown, NJ in the late 19th century.

The Apostoli family immigrated to NYC in the 1880s from the city San Benedetto del Tronto in the Ascoli Piceno Province in the Marche region of Italy.  Apostoli's mother died in child birth in the early 1920s and his father sent his other younger children back to live with relatives on the East coast and placed Freddy in the care of a Catholic orphanage in San Francisco. Apostoli attended grade school and high school in North Beach and was a lifelong friend of classmate Joe Dimaggio.

Apostoli's father was one of the workers killed in 1928 while working on a construction detail trying to access the damaged portion of a dam which had failed in Los Angeles County.  During his time in the orphanage, Apostoli and the other teens were encouraged by the nuns of the parish to work their disputes out through boxing. Freddie quickly became a master of said technique and showed such promise that the parish arranged for him to receive more formal training. These lessons at a local YMCA gym were partially funded thru the donations the parish had received over the years from his family back East.  Apostoli, who won the Pacific Coast Junior Welterweight championship, Golden Gloves Middleweight championship, and the National AAU middleweight championship in 1934, turned pro later that year.

Pro career

Middleweight contender
He quickly moved up the ladder and fought future middleweight champion Freddie Steele within his first seven months as a professional. Although the more experienced Steele stopped him in 10 rounds, Apostoli went on to defeat top fighters such as Swede Berglund, Babe Marino, Babe Risko, Solly Krieger and Lou Brouillard to become the leading contender for the world championship.

World middleweight champion
Eventually, Apostoli was matched with title claimant Marcel Thil; he defeated the Frenchman via a 10th-round TKO. The New York Boxing Commission, however, still recognized Freddie Steele as champion. In 1938, Apostoli fought Steele in a non-title rematch and avenged his earlier defeat with a 9th-round KO. On November 18, 1938, Apostoli won by TKO in the 8th round against Young Corbett III and was officially recognized by the NYSAC as absolute middleweight world champion.
Apostoli also fought as a light heavyweight. Although he dropped two close decisions to Hall of Famer Billy Conn, Conn always credited Apostoli as a great fighter who hurt him in both matches. On October 2, 1939, Apostoli's title reign ended when he lost the middleweight crown to Ceferino Garcia.

World War II service and retirement
Apostoli served in the United States Navy during World War II as a gunner aboard the light cruiser  in the Pacific theater.  Wounded in battle, he received a Bronze Star and returned to San Francisco in 1946.  He rehabilitated from injuries sustained in the Battle of Midway at Letterman Army Hospital located in the Presidio of San Francisco. He retired from the ring in 1948 and served as a member of the Olympic Club in San Francisco.

Professional boxing record

References

External links

1913 births
1973 deaths
Boxers from San Francisco
Middleweight boxers
International Boxing Hall of Fame inductees
Winners of the United States Championship for amateur boxers
United States Navy personnel of World War II
American male boxers